Dannhauser is a former coal mining town in KwaZulu-Natal, South Africa. Cattle and sheep farming take place in the district. The town of Dannhauser was named after Renier Dannhauser, a German settler, who purchased the farm Palmietfontein from the Natal Government in 1872. It was proclaimed a village in 1937.

Contemporary Dannhauser covers five farms, namely Tweediedale, Gleneagles, Rocky Branch, Cornwall and Klipkuil. Durnacol housing is relatively cheap now as the coal mines there are redundant.

The town consists of one main street, and the main shops are the post office, bank, pharmacy and some grocery and hardware stores.

References

Populated places in the Dannhauser Local Municipality
Mining communities in South Africa